The spinach pipefish (Microphis spinachioides)  is a species of fish in the family Syngnathidae. It is endemic to Papua New Guinea.
The species was last seen in 1985.

References

Sources

Microphis
Freshwater fish of Papua New Guinea
Fish described in 1915
Taxonomy articles created by Polbot